Bogomolets National Medical University (NMU) is a medical school founded in 1841 in Kyiv, Russian Empire by the Russian Tsar Nicolas I. The university is named after physiologist Alexander A. Bogomolets. NMU provides medical training for over 10,000 students, including about 1,300 foreigners from 56 countries. The university employs about 1,200 teaching staff.

Bogomolets National Medical University is one of the best medical universities in Ukraine. The degree of the university is recognized by the world's most credible organizations like WHO, UNESCO, MCI. It offers various courses in undergraduate and post-graduate levels to students. The university consists of 10 faculties. Bogomolets National Medical University also has a separate Institute for Post Graduate Education. The university is a pioneer in training medical specialists and research personnel in the field of healthcare. Bogomolets National Medical University has around 1500 professors. Included in the numbers are 855 Phd and 205 Doctors of Sciences. Thus, the students are trained by expert professionals and academicians in the field of medicine.

Alumni
 1860 : Vladimir Betz, was a Russian anatomist, histologist and professor of the Saint Vladimir University today (Bogomolets National Medical University), famous for the discovery of giant pyramidal neurons of primary motor cortex which later were named Betz cells.
 1925 : Favst Shkaravsky, was an officer, physician and forensic expert in the Soviet army during World War II. He is most famous for having overseen the autopsy of  Adolf Hitler and Eva Braun in 1945.
 1946 : Isaac Trachtenberg, member of National Academy of Sciences of Ukraine
 Maryna Poroshenko, First Lady of Ukraine
 1989 : Olga Bogomolets, singer, songwriter, physician, and presidential candidate
 Oleh Musiy, Minister of Healthcare (Ukraine)
 Elena Teplitskaya, doctor, psychologist and academic
 Serhiy Dyachenko, psychiatrist, screenwriter, fantasy fiction writer and novelist

References

 
Universities and colleges in Kyiv
Prospect Beresteiskyi
National universities in Ukraine
Medical schools in Ukraine
Institutions with the title of National in Ukraine